Errol Kerr (born April 12, 1986, in Brooklyn, New York) is a downhill skier formerly with the U.S. Ski Team. Kerr is the son of a Jamaican father and an American mother. Kerr started skiing at age 4 and started racing competitively at age 11.  Kerr cross-trained and raced  BMX and motocross. The multi-disciplined Kerr eventually found his niche in skicross.

Skiing career
Kerr made his World Cup debut in January 2008 with a twelfth place in Les Contamines, and followed up with an eighth place in Meiringen-Hasliberg in March. He opened the 2008–09 season with a thirtieth place in St. Johann in Tirol and a fifteenth place in Lake Placid, and then tenth place worldwide at the Skicross World Championships 2009 in Japan.

Kerr finished ninth overall at the 2010 Winter Olympics. This is the best placing by a Caribbean athlete at any Winter Olympics.

More recently, Kerr finished fifth in Skier X at Winter X Games XV.

References

1986 births
Living people
Jamaican male freestyle skiers
American people of Jamaican descent
People from Truckee, California
Freestyle skiers at the 2010 Winter Olympics
Olympic freestyle skiers of Jamaica